Guy Alexandre Auguste Sautter (c.1886 – 1961) was a French born badminton player who held both Swiss and English nationality.

Sautter won the All England Open Badminton Championships, considered the unofficial World Badminton Championships, in men's singles in 1911, 1913 and 1914. In the 1913 and 1914 editions, he competed under the alias U. N. Lapin.

References

John Arlott (Hrsg.): The Oxford companion to sports & games. Oxford University Press, London 1975
Pat Davis: The Encyclopaedia of Badminton. Robert Hale, London, 1987, p. 137, 
All England champions 1899-2007
Davis Cup statistics
Facts and Figures – Badminton chronology  on www.knowthegame.co.uk

Swiss male badminton players
Swiss male tennis players
English male badminton players
Swiss expatriate sportspeople in England
1880s births
1961 deaths